Claire Elizabeth Smith (born 1970) is a British TV Host, model and beauty pageant titleholder who won Miss United Kingdom in 1992. She went on to the Miss World 1992 in Sun City, South Africa, finishing as first runner-up. The winner was Miss Russia, Julia Kourotchkina.

References

Miss United Kingdom winners
Miss World 1992 delegates
Living people
1970 births